Ahlus Sunnah School is an Islamic school located in East Orange, New Jersey. Founded in 2005, the school serves students in grades PreK-12.

As of the 2017–18 school year, the school had an enrollment of 117 students (plus 25 in PreK) and 28 classroom teachers (on an FTE basis), for a student–teacher ratio of 4.2:1. The school's student body was 47.0% (55) Black, 19.7% (23) Asian, 17.1% (20) White, 13.7% (16) two or more races and 0.9% (1) Hispanic.

References

External links
School website
Madrasatu Ahlis Sunnah, National Center for Education Statistics

2005 establishments in New Jersey
East Orange, New Jersey
Educational institutions established in 2005
Islamic schools in New Jersey
Private elementary schools in New Jersey
Private high schools in Essex County, New Jersey
Private middle schools in New Jersey